Many places in German-speaking countries are called Kirchdorf (church village):

Germany 
 Baden-Württemberg
 Kirchdorf an der Iller, a municipality in the district of Biberach
 Bavaria
 Kirchdorf am Haunpold, former name of the municipality of Bruckmühl
 Kirchdorf am Inn, in the district of Rottal-Inn
 Kirchdorf Wildcats, an American football team from Kirchdorf am Inn
 Kirchdorf am Inn (Raubling), former name of the municipality of Raubling
 Kirchdorf an der Amper, a municipality in the district of Freising
 Kirchdorf im Wald, a municipality in the district of Regen
 Kirchdorf, Lower Bavaria, a municipality in the district of Kelheim
 Kirchdorf, Upper Bavaria, a municipality in the district of Mühldorf
 Hamburg
 Kirchdorf Süd in Hamburg-Wilhelmsburg
 Lower Saxony
 Kirchdorf, Lower Saxony, a municipality in the district of Diepholz
 Kirchdorf (Samtgemeinde), a Samtgemeinde in the district of Diepholz
 Kirchdorf (Deister), a part of the city Barsinghausen
 Mecklenburg-Vorpommern 
 Kirchdorf, Mecklenburg-Vorpommern, a municipality in the district Vorpommern-Rügen
 Kirchdorf (Poel), village on the island Poel

Poland 
 Kirchdorf, the German name for Stróżewo, Greater Poland Voivodeship, in western Poland

Austria 
 Kirchdorf (Amstetten)
 Kirchdorf am Inn, Upper Austria
 Kirchdorf an der Krems
 Kirchdorf in Tirol

Slovakia 
 Spišské Podhradie, also known as Kirchdorf amongst German-speakers.

Switzerland 
 Kirchdorf, Switzerland, a  municipality in the canton of Bern
 Kirchdorf, Aargau, part of Obersiggenthal